Motobe Dam is a concrete gravity dam located in Saga Prefecture in Japan. The dam is used for flood control and water supply. The catchment area of the dam is 2.3 km2. The dam impounds about 8  ha of land when full and can store 1140 thousand cubic meters of water. The construction of the dam was started on 1979 and completed in 1988.

References

Dams in Saga Prefecture
1988 establishments in Japan